The St. Joseph's Cathedral also called Cathedral of Kuching is a religious building that is affiliated with the Catholic Church and is located in the city of Kuching, capital of Sarawak state in northern Borneo island and east part of the Asian country of Malaysia.

The building follows the Roman or Latin rite and is the main mother church or the Metropolitan Archdiocese of Kuching (Archidioecesis Kuchingensis; Keuskupan Kuching Agung) which gained its current status by bull "Quoniam Favente Deo" of Pope Paul VI.

It is under the pastoral responsibility of Archbishop Simon Poh Hoon Seng since 4 March 2017.

See also
Roman Catholicism in Malaysia
Roman Catholic Archdiocese of Kuching
St. Joseph's Cathedral (disambiguation)

References

Roman Catholic cathedrals in Malaysia
Buildings and structures in Kuching
Roman Catholic churches in Sarawak